Domenico Cocoli (1747–1812) was an Italian mathematician and physicist, especially active on hydraulics. He was a top physicist of the late Republic of Venice, then of the Napoleonic Italian Republic.

Biography 
Born in Brescia in 1747, he began studying architecture and later was awarded a pension by a wealthy patron to continue his studies. In 1774 he had the chair of physics and mathematics. In 1777 he published his Elements of Geometry and Trigonometry. Thanks to the fame of the book, he became a consultant of the Republic of Venice being among the five physicists who took care of the problem of the floodings of the Brenta river. Until 1797 he carried out various assignments. In 1802 he was appointed member of the Collegio dei Dotti of the Napoleonic Italian Republic.

Works

See also 
 Drainage basin
 Trigonometry
 Communicating vessels
 Brescia

References 

18th-century Italian mathematicians
18th-century Italian physicists
1747 births
1812 deaths